Alexis Noel Thompson (born February 10, 1995) is an American professional golfer who plays on the LPGA Tour. At age 12, she was the youngest golfer ever to qualify to play in the U.S. Women's Open. She turned professional in June 2010 at age 15. On September 18, 2011, Thompson set a then new record as the youngest-ever winner of an LPGA tournament, at age 16 years, seven months, and eight days, when she won the Navistar LPGA Classic. Three months later she became the second-youngest winner of a Ladies European Tour event, capturing the Dubai Ladies Masters by four strokes on December 17, 2011.

Family and education
Thompson's two brothers are also professional golfers: Nicholas Thompson plays on the PGA and Korn Ferry Tours and Curtis Thompson plays on the Korn Ferry Tour. She was home-schooled and told an interviewer in September 2012 that she had "graduated a few months ago".

Amateur career
As a 12-year-old in 2007, she became the youngest player to qualify for the U.S. Women's Open. At the tournament, she shot 86-82 and failed to make the cut. The record was surpassed in 2014 by Lucy Li. Also in 2007, she won the Aldila Junior Classic to become the second-youngest winner in American Junior Golf Association (AJGA). She also won the Westfield Junior PGA Championship to become the youngest winner in Junior PGA Championship history.

In 2008, she won the U.S. Girls' Junior. She qualified again in 2008 for U.S. Women's Open where she shot 75-77 and she again failed to make the cut, this time by two strokes.

As a 14-year-old in 2009, she qualified for a third time for the U.S. Women's Open and made the cut for the first time, finishing tied for 34th, +11 (71-73-78-73=295). Later that year she Monday-qualified for the Navistar LPGA Classic, where she shot 65 in the first round and finished tied for 27th, 12 strokes behind winner, Lorena Ochoa.

In 2010 Thompson kept her amateur status for the first half of the year. As an amateur, she played in the Women's Australian Open, where she finished T16 (+3), 12 strokes behind the winner, Yani Tseng. She made the cut at the 2010 Kraft Nabisco Championship, finishing T24, +2 (74-72-73-71=290), 15 shots behind winner, Yani Tseng.  She also won the 2009 Verizon Junior Heritage after a sudden-death playoff with Laetitia Beck. She represented the winning United States team in the Curtis Cup competition and went undefeated, winning four matches and tying in a fifth. She turned pro the next week, stating she believed her game was ready to make the jump to the LPGA Tour.

Amateur highlights
 2003 – Won U.S. Kids Golf World Championship
 2004 – Won U.S. Kids Golf World Championship
 2007 – second round, U.S. Girls' Junior
 2007 quarterfinalist, U.S. Women's Amateur
 2008 – Won U.S. Girls' Junior (final 5 & 4 over Karen Chung)
 2009 third round, U.S. Girls' Junior
 2009 semifinalist, U.S. Women's Amateur

Professional career

2010
Thompson announced that she had turned professional on June 16, 2010. She signed sponsorship deals with Cobra-PUMA Golf and with Red Bull.

Lacking official status as an LPGA Tour member, Thompson largely had to rely on sponsors' exemptions to gain entry into tournaments. Her first sponsor's exemption was entry into the ShopRite LPGA Classic where she missed the cut by four strokes.

She played qualifiers held in Florida in May to gain entry to the U.S. Women's Open played July 8–11.
She finished T10 at the tournament, +6 (73-74-70-73=290), nine shots behind winner Paula Creamer, and collected her first professional check for $72,131.

Two weeks later at the Evian Masters, Thompson finished T2, −13 (69-72-67-67=275), one shot behind the winner, and made $242,711. After three professional events, her earnings were $314,842, which would have ranked 18th on the official LPGA money list if she had been a member of the LPGA Tour. Her result from the Evian Masters caused her to rise 75 places to number 74 in the Women's World Golf Rankings. She played three more events on the LPGA Tour in 2010, missing the cut at the CN Canadian Women's Open, and finishing T16 and T57 in two additional events.

Petition to LPGA
In December 2010, Thompson petitioned the LPGA to allow her to play in up to 12 LPGA tournaments in 2011 using sponsor exemptions instead of the six allowed to non-members by LPGA rules. In January 2011, Commissioner Mike Whan denied Thompson's petition, but announced that the LPGA rules would be changed to allow non-members to participate in Monday qualifying. In effect this gave Thompson the opportunity to play in more than 12 tournaments in 2011.

2011–2013

Thompson began playing in one-day tournaments in October 2010 on the Fuzion Minor League Golf Tour, a developmental tour aimed at men trying to move up to the next level of professional golf. On the Fuzion Tour, women play with tees moved up so that they play 94% of the distance that the men play. She returned to play against women in February 2011 at the Women's Australian Open and the ANZ Ladies Masters, where she missed the cut and finished T42 respectively. Returning to the United States, she won a one-round Fuzion Tour event, on February 21, at her home course in Coral Springs, Florida. Tied after 18 holes, she beat Brett Bergeron on the second playoff hole, for her first professional win. In March, Thompson attempted the Monday qualifier for the LPGA Kia Classic, but failed to qualify.

Thompson's first LPGA tournament in 2011 was the Avnet LPGA Classic, with a sponsor's exemption. After three rounds, she was tied for the lead with Song-Hee Kim. On Sunday, her score soared to 78, including back-to-back double bogeys on the 14th and 15th holes. Thompson finished tied for 19th at −1 (71-71-67-78=287), nine strokes behind the winner, Maria Hjorth. She missed the cut at the ShopRite LPGA Classic, at the LPGA Championship and at the U.S. Women's Open and tried but failed to Monday-qualify at the State Farm Classic. In her fifth LPGA tournament she played in 2011, the Evian Masters, she finished tied for 36th. She continued to play regularly on the Fuzion Tour, through the spring and summer. In August, she finished T31 at the Safeway Classic and then missed the cut at the Canadian Women's Open. In September, she won her first LPGA tournament, the Navistar LPGA Classic, by a five-stroke margin over LPGA Tour rookie Tiffany Joh. At age sixteen, she became the youngest winner ever on the LPGA Tour, breaking the previous record set by Marlene Hagge at age 18 in 1952. Her record stood for 11 months until 15-year-old Lydia Ko won the 2012 CN Canadian Women's Open on August 26, 2012.

On December 17, 2011, Thompson won the Dubai Ladies Masters, an event on the Ladies European Tour (LET), with a four-stroke margin. This win made her the youngest professional winner on the LET at age 16 years, 10 months, 7 days. The youngest-ever winner on the LET is Amy Yang, who was four months younger when she won the 2006 ANZ Ladies Masters as an amateur at 16 years, 6 months, 8 days.

Qualifying for 2012 LPGA membership
Thompson successfully petitioned the LPGA to receive a waiver to the rule that LPGA Tour members must be at least 18 years old, allowing her to enter the 2011 LPGA Qualifying School for Tour membership in 2012. The first of three stages was held July 26–29, 2011, at the LPGA International course in Daytona Beach, Florida. Thompson won Stage I by 10 strokes, shooting −23 (66-66-66-67=265). The top 50 finishers and ties from the first stage advanced to Stage II. After winning the Navistar LPGA Classic, Thompson withdrew from qualifying school and petitioned the LPGA for membership based on her win. Her petition was approved on September 30, 2011, and Thompson became a member of the tour for 2012.

Thompson earned her second and third career LPGA Tour wins with the Sime Darby LPGA Malaysia in October and the Lorena Ochoa Invitational in November.

2014
Thompson earned her fourth career LPGA win and first major championship at the 2014 Kraft Nabisco Championship. The victory made her the second-youngest women's major winner at the time.

2015
Thompson earned her fifth and sixth career wins at the Meijer LPGA Classic and the LPGA KEB Hana Bank Championship. She had her best season earning $1,763,904 which was 5th on the money list.

2016
In 2016 Thompson earned her seventh LPGA Tour win at the Honda LPGA Thailand.  On the LPGA Tour of Japan, she earned her first victory at the World Ladies Championship Salonpas Cup.  She had her best finish at the Women's British Open, T8th at Woburn Golf and Country Club.

2017
Thompson started the season at the Pure Silk-Bahamas LPGA Classic where, in the second round, she shot a 61 (−12). However, Brittany Lincicome won the tournament with a birdie on the first playoff hole. She earned her eighth LPGA Tour win at the Kingsmill Championship, where she finished −20 (65-65-69-65=264).

In April, Thompson was penalized four strokes for replacing her ball incorrectly on the green while playing the 17th hole during the third round of the 2017 ANA Inspiration. The infringement was reported in by a TV viewer and assessed after completion of the round, which meant that in addition to receiving a two-stroke penalty for replacing the ball incorrectly, she was also penalized two strokes for signing an incorrect scorecard. Despite this, she got into a playoff, eventually losing to Ryu So-yeon.

Thompson won the Indy Women in Tech Championship on September 9 for her 9th win. 	

At the season-ending CME Group Tour Championship, Thompson missed a 2-foot putt on the 18th hole to lose the tournament after Ariya Jutanugarn finished with back-to-back birdies. However, she did still win the overall Race to the CME Globe for the $1 million bonus.

2018
Thompson withdrew from the Ricoh Women's British Open in 2018 and took a month-long leave from the LPGA. In an Instagram she explained: "I have not truly felt like myself for quite some time," Thompson wrote on Instagram. "I am therefore taking this time to recharge my mental batteries, and to focus on myself away from the game of professional golf." After her break, Thompson missed two cuts before heading into the season-ending CME Group Tour Championship. On November 18, 2018, Thompson won the CME Group Tour Championship with an 18-under total giving her a four-shot victory over Nelly Korda. The victory, her first in over a year and the tenth of her professional career, was worth $500,000.

2019
On June 2, 2019, Thompson had her best finish a T2nd in the U.S. Women's Open at the Country Club of Charleston in Charleston, South Carolina. On June 9, Thompson won the ShopRite LPGA Classic outside of Atlantic City, New Jersey.

2020
Lexi Thompson started the year at the Diamond Resorts Tournament of Champions finishing T7th. In August, during the opening round of the AIG Women's Open, Thompson was involved in another rules controversy when she was observed by an official moving a tuft of grass behind her ball with her club; it was later deemed that her lie had not been improved, as the grass returned to its original position, and she escaped any penalty. She went on to miss the cut.

2021
In June 2021, Thompson led the U.S. Women's Open going into the last round at The Olympic Club in San Francisco, California. In the final round, towards the end of her front nine, Thompson led by five strokes. However, she shot a five-over par 41 on the back nine and missed out on a playoff by one stroke.

2022
After her tie for fifth place, earning $79,951 at the Meijer LPGA Classic on June 19, she moved to 10th on the all-time career money list on the LPGA Tour, earning $12,608,045 in 230 events over 10 years, starting from her LPGA membership in 2012.

Professional wins (15)

LPGA Tour wins (11)

LPGA Tour playoff record (0–4)

Ladies European Tour wins (2)

LPGA of Japan Tour wins (1)

Other wins (1)
2011 TPC February Shootout (Fuzion Minor League Golf Tour)

Major championships

Wins (1)

Results timeline
Results not in chronological order before 2019 or in 2020.

^ The Evian Championship was added as a major in 2013.

LA = Low amateur
CUT = missed the half-way cut
NT = no tournament
"T" = tied

Summary

 Most consecutive cuts made – 24 (2013 Evian – 2018 Women's PGA)
 Longest streak of top 10s – 3 (twice)

LPGA Tour career summary

^ Official as of 2022 season
* Includes matchplay and other events without a cut.
1 Earnings and top-10s prior to 2012 are unofficial because Thompson was not an LPGA member.
2 Official 2012 earnings do not include $23,107 from T14 finish at the Honda LPGA Thailand. LPGA rules specify that earnings by players who gain entrance to an international tournament using a sponsor's exemption are unofficial.

Professional record and earnings outside of Tour membership 

Results in all tournaments in which Thompson has played since turning pro in June 2010 through the end of 2011. During this time she was a professional golfer but not a member of any golf tour.

 Dates are span of competitive rounds, regardless of whether Thompson participated in all rounds.
 Margin = strokes behind winner or cutline, not applicable in cases of withdrawal, disqualification or matchplay format.
 Earnings are rounded up to the nearest dollar.
 1On the Fuzion Tour, women play with tees moved up so that they play 94% of the distance that the men play.
 2 The winner's prize was 75,000 Euros. US dollar equivalent based on exchange rate current as of December 17, 2011.

World ranking
Position in Women's World Golf Rankings at the end of each calendar year.

^ as of 27 February 2023

U.S. national team appearances
Amateur
 Junior Ryder Cup: 2008 (winners)
 Junior Solheim Cup: 2009 (winners)
 Curtis Cup: 2010 (winners)

Professional
 Solheim Cup: 2013, 2015 (winners), 2017 (winners), 2019, 2021
 International Crown: 2014, 2016 (winners), 2018

Curtis Cup record

Solheim Cup record

See also
List of golfers with most LPGA major championship wins
List of golfers with most LPGA Tour wins

References

External links

American female golfers
LPGA Tour golfers
Winners of LPGA major golf championships
Solheim Cup competitors for the United States
Olympic golfers of the United States
Golfers at the 2016 Summer Olympics
Golfers at the 2020 Summer Olympics
Golfers from Florida
Sportspeople from Coral Springs, Florida
1995 births
Living people
21st-century American women